Leo Flieg (5 November 1893 – 15 March 1939) was a German politician, and a founder member of the Communist Party of Germany, regarded by some as an "Éminence grise" to the national leadership.   He served as a member of the Prussian regional parliament ("Provinziallandtag") between 1924 and 1933. In 1938 he was arrested in Moscow where he had lived for some years. He was executed in 1939.

Life 
Leopold Flieg was born into a jewish working-class family in Berlin. His mother and sister, along with a number of relatives, would be murdered in the Holocaust.

On leaving school Flieg undertook a commercial apprenticeship at a bank, and he worked as a bank official till the outbreak of the war.   In 1908, aged fifteen, he joined the Young Socialists. Three years later, still aged only eighteen, he joined the Social Democratic Party ("Sozialdemokratische Partei Deutschlands" / SPD) itself. 1911 was also the year in which he became a member of the "Zentralverband der Handlungsgehilfen" (loosely: "National Clerical Workers' Union").   There are indications that he was already on the fringes of the social circle centred on the political pioneers, Rosa Luxemburg and Karl Liebknecht.   During the First World War Flieg was conscripted into the army, but he was wounded early on and spent the war years in Berlin where he was employed as a "soldier-clerk" in the "secret department" of the General Staff.

During the war years Flieg was involved actively with the anti-war Spartacus League, and he was one of the founders of one of the Free Socialist Youth ("Freie sozialistische Jugend") organisations of the time.   In 1918, working as secretary for Leo Jogiches, a close friend of Rosa Luxemburg he increasingly became an "insider" with the leadership of what would soon become the German Communist Party.   Flieg was always noted for his discretion and reticent demeanour, however.   His manner was famously measured and he never raised his voice.   During 1918 he began a lifelong friendship with Willi Münzenberg, but the extent of his influence in extremist left-wing circles during the crucial final months of 1918 remains unclear.

The founding congress of the Communist Party of Germany took place in Berlin over three days between 30 December 1918 and 1 January 1919.   The core of the founding membership consisted of those who had hitherto been Spartacus League members: Leo Flieg was a party member and part of the leadership team from the outset.   He worked closely with Willi Münzenberg on the creation of the Young Communist International ("Kommunistische Jugendinternationale" / KJI), serving as a member of its executive committee from its launch in 1919 till March 1922. During the immediate postwar years Flieg was lodging in Berlin with the family of a girl friend.   The father of the family, who worked at the giant Osram factory in Berlin, was heard to marvel at the abstemious ways of his daughter's seemingly unassuming friend:  "I was amazed that Leo managed a whole egg for breakfast:  half that amount would most certainly have been enough for him!" ("Mich wundert es eigentlich, das Leo zum Frühstück ein ganzes Ei schafft, ein halbes würde ihm sicher auch genügen!").

From 1922, jointly with Käthe Pohl, Flieg served as secretary to the Organisation Office ("Orgbüro") of the party politburo.    He participated in every congress conducted by the Communist Party of Germany between 1920 and 1932.   In 1924 he stood successfully for election to the Prussian regional parliament ("Provinziallandtag") as a Communist Party member.   Successively re-elected at subsequent elections, he retained his seat without a break till 1932. He was elected to the party Central Committee in 1927 and appears to have joined the politburo shortly afterwards.   At the sixth world congress, in 1928, he joined the Comintern International Control Commission.

One source indicates that from 1928 Flieg made his home in the Comintern's so-called "Hotel Lux" in Moscow, though the extent of his activities in Germany suggests that at this point much of his time was still spent in Berlin.   Leo Flieg liked to operate behind the scenes, which can make it hard to pin down details of his work for the German Communist Party.   According to one source, records uncovered in Moscow during 1992/93 show that during the early 1930s, as a secretary of the party and commissioner of the Comintern Intelligence Service ("Отдел международной связи, " / OMS), Leo Flieg was in charge of spending an annual subsidy from Moscow valued at 1.8 million marks, co-ordinating false passports, radio operators and couriers.   He himself headed up a counterfeiting operation with 170 "employees".   This intelligence role was conducted in close collaboration with the Soviet secret police.

The Soviet Communist Party became increasingly polarised during the later 1920s between those who were supportive of Stalin and those who dared to be thought to speculate that perhaps Lenin's successor should have been Leon Trotsky.   The Soviet party and the German Party were closely linked at various levels:  party ruptures in Moscow found powerful echoes among the comrades in Berlin, with a major programme of expulsions during 1928 and the establishment by many of those expelled of an alternative party.   Sources insist that through this period Leo Flieg carried out his party functions with skill, loyalty and meticulous care, without regard to whether the party leadership might be considered too far to the left or too far to the right.   Then, in May 1932 Flieg was relieved by the German Party of his party responsibilities, seen as having become too close to Heinz Neumann, a close political comrade and a personal friend.   In 1930/31 Neumann had become critical of the party leader Ernst Thälmann, and thereby also of Stalin, both of whom, he said, were underestimating the dangers presented by the rise of the Nazi Party.   In April 1932 Neumann was stripped of his party functions and summoned to Moscow. Flieg was identified as a "member of the Neumann group" and his demotions, accompanied by the inevitable mutterings about Trotskyite sympathies, followed a few weeks later. His membership of the politburo was reduced to "candidate membership".

Despite his disgrace in Germany, Flieg still had influential friend in Moscow as a result of his years as linkman for the Berlin activities of the OMS.  He knew Piatnitsky and Abramov-Mirov and other Comintern leaders from long years of working together on "intelligence matters".   By the end of 1932 he was working in Moscow for the Comintern executive committee.   Sources are not entirely consistent over his postings over the next few years.   In January 1933 the Nazis took power in Germany and Communist Party activists were either arrested (or worse) or escaped abroad.   Moscow and Paris both quickly became informal headquarter locations for the German Communist Party in exile.  Flieg was sent to Paris and was able to renew his important hands-on political work as a "technical secretary to the politburo". By 1934 he was evidently rehabilitated by the Germany party, and there is mention of his having been sent by the politburo Central Committee not just to Paris, but also to Saarbrücken during the run-up to the 1935 referendum, and to Prague.   In October 1935 the exiled German Communist Party held its first party conference since the Nazi take-over in Berlin.   The Brussels Conference was also the last conference that the party would be able to hold for more than ten years.   Flieg participated, identified pseudonymously as "Alfons", and presented the party's finance report.   He was re-elected to the party Central Committee.   After that he was probably based in Paris till 1937.

During 1937 Leo Flieg was deprived of his German nationality and so became stateless. At Easter that year he received an invitation from the Comintern to a meeting in Moscow.   Those with contacts in the Soviet Union were by this time fully aware of the rising level of political arrests under way in what later came to be known in English language sources as the Great Purge.   Flieg knew the risks inherent in returning to Moscow and friends urged him to stay in Paris.   The Swedish banker Olof Aschberg urged him not to go, and promised support in seeking "emigrant status" from the French authorities.   But Flieg felt constrained to accept the invitation.   He had responsibilities for party monies, and feared he might be accused of embezzlement by Comintern chiefs in Moscow if he did not comply with their order.

Flieg returned to Moscow in June 1937 and installed himself once more in the "Hotel Lux".   His meeting with Comintern management took place, but he received only a reprimand.   Early in 1938 the German representative among the Comintern leadership, Philipp Dengel, lodged an application for Flieg to be permitted to leave the country again.   Authorisation never came through.   Instead, on 20 March 1938, Leo Flieg was arrested by the NKVD and charge with "membership of a right-wing Trotskyite spying organisation".

According to a television report of research undertaken by the Hamburg historian, Reinhard Müller, Leo Flieg was tortured for an entire year ("Flieg wurde ein ganzes Jahr lang gefoltert ...."). In the course that lengthy succession of torture sessions he was persuaded to incriminate himself and many others.   In the written "confession" extracted from him he confirmed his membership of a Comintern anti-Soviet conspiracy.   On 14 March 1939 Leo Flieg was condemned to death by a military tribunal of the High Court and executed by shooting.   He was posthumously rehabilitated in 1957.

Personal paranoia at the top of the Soviet government which underpinned the Great purge can be seen as a sufficient explanation for Flieg's conviction.   He was only one of many hundred Comintern workers and collaborators who fell victim to it. Documents from the Soviet Union that became available after 1990 disclosed a hitherto unsuspected level of involvement by leading members of the German community of exiled communists in Moscow.   In the words of one headline that appeared in 1990, "more than a thousand German communists fell victim to the Stalin Terror, with the approval of leading comrades in the Communist Party of Germany". Subsequent investigation of contemporary documents suggests to some that the involvement of the leading German communist comrades probably extended beyond mere approval. In 2002 work undertaken on more recently studied Soviet documents led one specialist historian to point the finger at Herbert Wehner (identified in Soviet records of the time under the party name "Kurt Funk").   Wehner returned from Soviet exile in 1946 and rose to become a leading figure in West Germany's Social Democratic Party.   Under NKVD interrogation in the Lubyanka Building during 1937 Wehner found himself accused of joint responsibility for the arrest, in Germany, of the German party leader, Ernst Thälmann, back in 1933.   The accusation might have been expected to have ended in Wehner's death, but it did not.   Wehner chose to co-operate.   He wrote for his interrogators a lengthy report entitled "Report of investigation into deeply ingrained Trotzkyite activity in the German anti-fascist movement" ("Untersuchungsbericht zur trotzkistischen Wühlarbeit in der deutschen antifaschistischen Bewegung").   The report included the names of all the communist German political exiles in Moscow who shortly afterwards fell under suspicion of being "Trotskyites" and / or members of "counter-revolutionary groups".   Wehner's report on Flieg included the observation that he had been characterised by party leader Ernst Thälmann as a rogue (" Er sei, so Wehner, vom Vorsitzenden Ernst Thälmann als Gauner bezeichnet worden"). Soon after Wehner submitted his report hundreds of German communist party refugees were detained by the Soviet authorities.   For Reinhard Müller this was part of a desperate "survival strategy", which for a terrified Herbert Wehner worked in its own terms, but for which hundreds of others paid the price. An alternative interpretation might be that the German political exiles caught up in the Stalin purges would have been arrested anyway, and Wehner's active collusion merely facilitated the exercise.

References 

Politicians from Berlin
Social Democratic Party of Germany politicians
People of the German Revolution of 1918–1919
Communist Party of Germany politicians
19th-century German Jews
German Comintern people
Jewish socialists
Prussian politicians
Communists in the German Resistance
Refugees from Nazi Germany in the Soviet Union
Great Purge victims from Germany
Jews executed by the Soviet Union
1893 births
1939 deaths